Embrace the Dead is the second album by Indonesian extreme metal band Kekal. It reached sold-out status in 2004. On 15 August 2010, a new, remastered limited edition entitled Embrace the Dead 1999 was released as a free download, for up to a 1000 downloads. On 18 May 2012, Kekal made the re-mastered edition available for purchase on Bandcamp, citing exorbitant prices for second-hand copies of the original album on sites like Amazon.

Recording
Embrace the Dead was, according to the band, the most difficult recording session for any of its albums. The band had almost no budget, and encountered problems with 16-track analog tape recorder that it was using. Because of the budget problems, the band could not book the studio ahead of time, and had to use left-over time from other band's recording sessions. This resulted in chaotic production quality, as the band had to reset the sound and mixing levels each time it recorded. Overall, it took almost seven months for the band to record the album. After recording, the band faced additional problems with releasing the album. The original cassette tape version was released in August 1999 for the Southeast Asian market only by Indonesian label THT Productions, but according to the band the original release date of the CD version was pushed forward to July 2000, when it was released on Fleshwalker Records, and then THT Productions released the CD version in February 2001.

Track listing

Release history

Personnel
Jeff – guitars, vocals, keys, additional bass
Azhar – bass, vocals, additional guitar
Leo – guitars
Habil Kurnia – keys, engineering and mixing
Vera – female vocals
The Black Machine – drums
Prastowo Aklisugoro – engineering and mixing
Denny Andreas – engineering and mixing
Jeff – engineering and mixing
Jeff/Soundmind Graphics – cover layout design

References

1999 albums
Kekal albums
Death metal albums by Indonesian artists
Doom metal albums
Dark wave albums